The 2005 WNBA season was the 6th for the Indiana Fever. The Fever achieved their first playoff series victory, but their road to the WNBA Finals ended when the Connecticut Sun swept the Fever in the next round.

Offseason

WNBA Draft

Regular season

Season standings

Season schedule

Playoffs

Player stats

Awards and honors
Tamika Catchings, WNBA Defensive Player of the Year Award

References

External links
Fever on Basketball Reference

Indiana Fever seasons
Indiana
Indiana Fever